A new double-tiered local government system was implemented after the Local Government (Scotland) Act 1973 was passed. These two tiers were regional councils and district councils.

No political party fielded candidates in the Annandale and Eskdale District Council election in 1974.

Results by Ward

References

1974 Scottish local elections
Annandale